2-Naphthalenethiol is an organosulfur compound with the formula C10H7SH.  It is a white solid.    It is one of two monothiols of naphthalene, the other being 1-naphthalenethiol.

Synthesis and reactions
2-Naphthalenethiol is prepared from 2-naphthol by the Newman–Kwart rearrangement starting from a thiocarbamate.  It undergoes lithiation at the 1 and 3-position.

It can be used as a flavouring agent.

References

Thiols
2-Naphthyl compounds